Sherpur Kalan is a large village and a kasbah in Pilibhit district in the Indian state of Uttar Pradesh. Commonly spoken languages include Urdu, Hindi, and Punjabi.

References

Villages in Pilibhit district